Eric P. Liu (born 1968) is an American writer, former civil servant, and founder of Citizen University, a non-profit organization promoting civics education and awareness. Liu served as Deputy Assistant to President Clinton for Domestic Policy at the White House between 1999 and 2000. He served as Speechwriter and Director of Legislative Affairs for the National Security Council at the White House from 1993 to 1994. President Obama nominated him in January 2015 to serve on the board of directors of the federal Corporation for National and Community Service and he was confirmed by the U.S. Senate; his term expired in December 2017.

Early life
Liu was born in Poughkeepsie, New York, to parents born in China who later moved to Taiwan. His uncle is Taiwanese Premier Liu Chao-shiuan.

Career
He studied history at Yale University and is a graduate of Harvard Law School.

Liu today is CEO of Citizen University, a non-profit organization that promotes what it calls "powerful citizenship". Citizen University's programs include Civic Saturdays, a civic analogue to a faith gathering. His 2014 TED talk on civic power, "Why ordinary people need to understand power", has been viewed more than two million times. His other TED Talks, on civic religion and on voting, have also been viewed millions of times. In 2014, he launched the Aspen Institute Program on Citizenship and American Identity to advance conversation about the nature of American national identity.

Liu has authored many books, most recently Become America: Civic Sermons on Love, Responsibility, and Democracy, which collects sermons he wrote and delivered at Civic Saturdays around the country. His 2017 book You're More Powerful Than You Think is a citizen's guide to the practice of power. His book A Chinaman's Chance (2014) explores being Chinese American in the age of China and America. He is also the author of Guiding Lights: The People Who Lead Us Toward Our Purpose in Life (2005), about transformative mentors, leaders and teachers, and The Accidental Asian: Notes of a Native Speaker (1998), about ethnicity, identity and acculturation. Liu is a frequent contributor to TheAtlantic.com. He wrote the "Teachings" column for Slate magazine from 2002 to 2005.

Liu and businessman Nick Hanauer have co-authored two political books: The True Patriot (Sasquatch Books, 2007), which defines patriotism in progressive terms, and The Gardens of Democracy (Sasquatch Books, 2011), which presents a 21st-century way of envisioning citizenship, the economy, and the role of government. In 2013, Liu and Hanauer suggested a demand-side macroeconomic theory, Middle-out economics, which identifies the buying power of the middle class as the necessary ingredient for job creation and economic growth.

Liu lives in Seattle, where he has served on the Seattle Public Library Board of Trustees and on the Washington State Board of Education. He has taught civic leadership courses at the University of Washington and is the co-founder of the Alliance for Gun Responsibility.

Together with Danielle S. Allen and Stephen B. Heintz , Liu chaired the bipartisan Commission on the Practice of Democratic Citizenship of the American Academy of Arts and Sciences. The commission, which was launched "to explore how best to respond to the weaknesses and vulnerabilities in our political and civic life and to enable more Americans to participate as effective citizens in a diverse 21st-century democracy", issued a report, titled Our Common Purpose: Reinventing American Democracy for the 21st Century, in June 2020. The report included strategies and policy recommendations "to help the nation emerge as a more resilient democracy by 2026."

Liu was elected as a member of the American Academy of Arts and Sciences in 2020.

Liu was named an Ashoka Fellow in 2020. Fellows are leading social entrepreneurs recognized for their innovative solutions to social problems and potential to change patterns across society.

Publications

 The Accidental Asian: Notes of a Native Speaker (1998) OCLC 686758644

 You're More Powerful Than You Think (2017) 

 Become America: Civic Sermons on Love, Responsibility, and Democracy (2019)

See also

 List of Asian American writers

References

Further reading
Critical studies
 David Leiwei Li, "On Ascriptive and Acquisitional Americanness: The Accidental Asian and the Illogic of Assimilation." Contemporary Literature, 2004 Spring; 45 (1): 106–34

External links
 
 Gardens of Democracy Web site'''
 The Guiding Lights Network Web site
 
 C-SPAN Q&A interview with Liu, January 23, 2005

1968 births
Living people
Journalists from New York (state)
Writers from Poughkeepsie, New York
American people of Chinese descent
American people of Taiwanese descent
American journalists of Chinese descent
American writers of Chinese descent
Yale University alumni
Harvard Law School alumni
University of Washington faculty
United States National Security Council staffers
American chief executives of education-related organizations
Slate (magazine) people
Clinton administration personnel
Ashoka USA Fellows